This article is about the 2009 season of the Wigan Warriors in the Super League XIV and Challenge Cup.

Background

Following Brian Noble's move from the Bradford Bulls to the Wigan Warriors in 2006, his third full season at the club took place in 2009. The season was also the first in which the Super League operated under a franchise system, after the Wigan Warriors were granted a 'B' license. The salary cap, which the club broke in 2007, was still in effect for this season, and the limit remained at GBP£1.7 million; the cap was maintained 'live', in continuation of an operational change by the Rugby Football League in 2008. As an ever-present club in the Super League format, this season was the Wigan Warriors' fourteenth year in the competition. This year also marked the tenth anniversary of rugby league at the JJB Stadium, after the club moved there upon the stadium's completion in 1999.

In contrast to the club's historical success, Wigan Warriors had not won a major trophy since 2002, when they defeated St Helens R.F.C. 12–21 in the Challenge Cup final. They had only won the Super League title once, in 1998. In the previous season the Wigan Warriors finished fourth in the league table meaning they qualified for the play-offs, and after defeating Bradford Bulls and Catalans Dragons, the club fell short of the 2008 Super League Grand Final after losing to Leeds Rhinos at Headingley for the second year running.

Pre-season

Following their knock-out at the hands of Leeds, the task of acquiring new players began. 2008 was influential stand-off Trent Barrett's last season for the Warriors, after he signed for the Cronulla Sharks for the 2009 National Rugby League (NRL) season; Barrett himself insisted that Tim Smith could replace him, after Smith was released by Parramatta Eels following an episode of bipolar disorder. It was also to be the last season for Liam Colbon and Mark Calderwood, who both transferred away from the club. An attempt to sign the Canberra Raiders' Todd Carney ended after Huddersfield Giants signed him instead. The club prevented a possible cross-code transfer with George Carmont to rugby union by extending his contract. Wigan eventually signed their first new player with former Sydney Roosters player Amos Roberts, who was released from his contract a year prematurely, but lost another player to the Warrington Wolves in Mickey Higham. Joel Tomkins, a Wigan Warriors Youth Development product, also extended his contract until the end of the 2011 season. Rumours about a move for Ryan McGoldrick ended after he publicly ruled out any possible transfer. The question over Barrett's successor in the stand-off position was again raised when Tim Smith, who was on holiday in his native Australia at the time, approached the Cronulla Sharks seeking a return to the NRL, although the club did not pursue any deal with Smith and he therefore stayed at Wigan for the 2009 season. Greg Bird, who had been suspended by Cronulla Sharks for an alleged assault on his girlfriend was also cited by The Independent as a target for the Warriors, but any plans of a transfer were initially denied by the club's chairman, Ian Lenagan. On 30 January 2009, Lenagan confirmed it was unlikely there would be any more signings for the new season, having acquired two new players (Amos Roberts and Mark Riddell), after attempts to sign Richard Moore from Wakefield Trinity Wildcats failed.

The 2008 Rugby League World Cup was held in Australia during the off-season, and several Wigan players from the 2008 season were involved in matches concerning their own international teams. Pat Richards, Eamon O'Carroll and Michael McIlorum were called by the Irish team, with Paul Prescott missing out due to a back injury. Carmont and Harrison Hansen were selected for the Samoan national team. Stuart Fielden was omitted from the England squad but Calderwood, Higham and Gareth Hock all received places. Thomas Leuluai became the only Super League player from the 2008 season to win the World Cup when the New Zealand team he played hooker for defeated the Australian team 20–34 in the final.

Wigan played three friendly matches after the World Cup, the first being a 4–44 victory over Warrington Wolves at the Halliwell Jones Stadium during the traditional festive season, in which Riddell and Karl Pryce both made their first-team debuts. The Warriors played in a changed pink and black-hooped jersey in support of a local hospice, as Sam Tomkins completed a twenty-minute hat-trick, Richard Mathers and Pryce scored a double each, and Shaun Ainscough and Joel Tomkins also picked up one try apiece. The next match against Huddersfield Giants proved to be more difficult, as Carmont scored a last-minute try to hand Wigan a narrow victory at the Galpharm Stadium, with Riddell scoring two tries and Fielden being sin-binned in the first half. On the official opening on the new Leigh Sports Village and a week before the new Super League season began, the Warriors whitewashed their local rivals Leigh Centurions by 0–32 with a squad in which both new signings, Roberts and Riddell, were left out of.

Season overview

February

Wigan's season began on 8 February with a home defeat to a depleted Wakefield Trinity Wildcats side which only had seventeen players to fill their squad with due to injuries, and the death of Adam Watene during the off-season. Head coach Brian Noble blamed the result on a poor completion rate of 40%. Wakefield took an early lead after Dave Halley crossed the line in the first minute, before scoring again via the same player in the fourteenth minute to make a 0–12 initiative, following two successful conversions by Tony Martin. Joel Tomkins was introduced into the game in the second half as he scored a try which was converted by Pat Richards, but Wigan failed to score again. Richard Mathers, who was sent-off twice in 2008, was put into the sin-bin by the referee, Richard Silverwood, for the deliberate obstruction of Halley, and match ended in the first defeat for Wigan in their 2009 campaign.

Prior to their next match, the Warriors announced a partnership with the University of Central Lancashire, as part of an effort to promote rugby league in the Preston area, in exchange for the student team at the university displaying the Wigan Warriors logo. This news was announced on the same day Mathers learned he would miss the next two matches for tripping Halley, including the club's next match against Hull F.C. which they lost at the KC Stadium. Hull FC started strongly, but Wigan scored first off a Tim Smith kick to Goulding and Phelps which eventually resulted in a try for Bailey. Richard Horne scored for Hull to level the scores at 6–6 before a last resort intervention from Kirk Yeaman denied Goulding a try. The scores were therefore level at half-time, and a kick from Smith resulted in another try for Richards who bettered his opposite winger, Mark Calderwood in the air. With four key players missing—Riddell, Phelps, Bailey and Richards—due to injury, Wigan tired in the final quarter allowing Chris Thorman and Peter Cusack to score late in the game to put the tie beyond the visiting team.

With Mathers suspended and Cameron Phelps injured with a hamstring injury and two other injury concerns, Karl Pryce and Shaun Ainscough were given places in the initial 19-man squad to take on Castleford Tigers. A third defeat out of three matches came as Castleford won a ten try game 22–28, a result which meant Wigan's worst start to a season in twenty-four years. With Richards still missing due to injury, conversions proved to be the difference as both teams scored five tries apiece, but kickers Roberts and Riddell could only manage one successful kick whilst the Tigers' kicker Kirk Dixon managed four. Two disallowed Castleford tries in the first ten minutes were followed by two penalty goals by Dixon to give Castleford a 0–4 lead. Thomas Leuluai's effort gave Wigan a try before Joe Westerman put the Tigers ahead again after 34 minutes. Castleford scored again through Brett Ferres, with Dixon converting to give Castleford a 6–16 lead at half-time. Wigan scored first after the break thanks to a try from Karl Pryce, but this was unconverted and Castleford replied with two more of their own with Dixon and Ferres scoring his second try. Wigan started a fight back, initially through a Goulding try, and then again through Joel Tomkins. Ainscough marked his debut with a fifty-yard try to reduce the deficit to two points, but Michael Shenton's try sealed the victory for Castleford. Michael McIlorum was also cited and suspended by the Rugby Football League after the game for a dangerous throw on Mitchell Sargent. After failing to gain a point from the first three matches in the season, Noble's position as head coach was strengthened when Ian Lenagan publicly supported him, stating, "Brian is a very experienced coach and I'm sure we'll get this right. He has had bad starts to the season before, and he has good starts."

Wigan recorded their first win of the season with an 18–24 victory over Harlequins RL at the Twickenham Stoop in London. Ainscough scored his first of two tries after a break from Roberts down the wing, and it was converted by Richards who was playing at fullback as a replacement for Mathers who was omitted from the squad. Chad Randall punished Joel Tomkins' handling error for Harlequins' first try before Matt Gafa scored another try for the home side to make the half-time score 10–6. On his Super League debut, Sam Tomkins—Joel's younger brother—was involved in the build-up to Carmont's try after the second half had begun, and Bailey scored another try to put Wigan 10–14 ahead following two missed conversion attempts. A disallowed try for a knock-on by Will Sharp was followed by a knock-on from Carmont, before a 40-20 gave Louis McCarthy-Scarsbrook a chance to score a try in the 64th minute. Chris Melling restored a four-point lead for the home side with ten minutes left in the game after Harrison Hansen knocked-on. In the 75th minute, Randall's pass was intercepted by Roberts for an easy intercept try which Richards converted to give a two-point lead, which was increased to six as Ainscough scored the final try of the game.

March

The start of March was also the start of the reserve team's season, which begin with a comfortable win against Bradford Bulls. Richards scored twenty points including eight goals and a try as the first team earned their first home victory of the season, winning by a margin of thirty-four points. Richards scored the first of seven Wigan tries after nine minutes, before Hock broke the defensive line to put Wigan 12–0 ahead. Another line break from Hock provided an offload to Carmont who scored a third try. A twenty-point gap emerged as Richards kicked a penalty conceded by Paul Sykes, before Bradford scored their first of two tries through Rikki Sheriffe after 48 minutes. Hock replied by scoring his second try, before a line break by Riddell handed a try to Harrison Hansen. Wayne Godwin broke his leg after stopping an Iafeta Palea'aesina run, before Palea'aesina himself scored Wigan's final try. Steve Menzies scored his first Bradford try before the match ended.

Wigan's run of victories was short-lived as they lost the away tie to Leeds Rhinos immediately after. An unchanged Wigan side from the tie against Bradford could only score two tries, conceding six the other way. The victory was the Rhinos' fifth out of five matches, and they were ahead after three minutes thanks to a 40–20 which was converted into a try by Kylie Leuluai. An error from Ainscough proved costly as Scott Donald scored from the resulting turnover. Upon the half-hour mark, Leeds were 22–0 ahead after Rob Burrow touched down under the sticks and another 40–20 provided a try, this time for Ryan Hall. Ainscough scored Wigan's first try following a pass from Thomas Leuluai, before Wigan were disallowed another try after the video referee Phil Bentham ruled Sean O'Loughlin had obstructed Burrow. Hall scored his second, besting Roberts in the air, after fifty minutes. Peacock scored Leeds' sixth try, bursting through the defensive line, whilst Hock scored the last try of the game.

An away tie to Salford City Reds was more favourable for Wigan as they eased to victory at The Willows. Salford had the first major chance of the game as a kick from the 18-year-old Richie Myler was knocked-on by Jeremy Smith. Carmont replied, catching an offload from former-Salford player Andy Coley, to hand a try to Ainscough. Myler again created an opportunity, but Karl Fitzpatrick was pushed into touch. A break via Ainscough and Riddell gave Leuluai a try, before Myler scored Salford's first try following a kick from Jeremy Smith. Sam Tomkins saw a hole in the defensive line and ran through it, scoring Wigan's third try, before Richards scored a fourth to make the half-time score 22–6. Wigan scored first again in the second half as Sam Tomkins scored from the half-way line, before Ainscough scored his second. Myler and Jeremy Smith again combined for the former's second try, this time from a pass, but Richards sealed the game for Wigan after offloading to Leuluai for his second and Wigan's seventh try. The win was dampened by the injury of Ireland international Eamon O'Carroll, who fractured his metatarsal bone during the reserve game against Salford.

In a game that was 8–10 going into the final ten minutes, and had three players sent to the sin-bin, Wigan lost their third home game. Amos Roberts returned after being dropped to the reserves the week before, whilst the visiting Huddersfield team contained five former Wigan players. Brett Hodgson gave Huddersfield the initiative by kicking a penalty for a 0–2 lead, and Hock almost responded but knocked-on in the act of scoring a try. Bailey eventually scored a try for Wigan, but Richards failed to convert, and the score was made level after another kicked penalty from Brett Hodgson. Scott Moore gave Huddersfield the lead again after a run from dummy half to give a 4–10 lead, despite a take-out on Leuluai just before half-time which went unpenalised. Luke Robinson was sin-binned for delaying play and Roberts almost made the advantage count, but grounded the ball in touch and the try was disallowed. Darrell Griffin and Hansen were then sin-binned for a fight, before passing along the backs lead to a Roberts try, but Richards again failed to convert. Ainscough then fumbled a kick from Robinson, and Michael Lawrence punished the mistake by scoring a try for Huddersfield. Brown scored minutes later to put the game beyond Wigan.

April

The fourth round of the 2009 Challenge Cup occupied the first weekend of April, and for all Super League clubs this meant their first Challenge Cup ties. In March, Wigan learned that they would face an away tie to the Barrow Raiders, and it was expected this match would be held in front of the first sell-out crowd at Barrow's Craven Park for twenty-five years. The game itself was still in the balance fifteen minutes from time, with Barrow trailing Wigan by four points at 20–24, following a match which had seen a Shaun Ainscough hat-trick and Wigan's defensive frailties exploited again. The result pivoted on a forward pass decision which ruled out another Barrow try, minutes before Pryce scored a controversial try for Wigan in which he appeared to have knocked-on, with twelve minutes left to play. A try from Tomkins eventually sealed the win for Wigan to advance them into the fifth round of the competition.

On the day after, it was confirmed Martin Gleeson would transfer to Wigan from the Warrington Wolves, on a three and a half-year contract. The signing came after Warrington had left Gleeson out of the squad which defeated York City Knights in their fourth round Cup tie, meaning Gleeson would be eligible to play for Wigan in future Cup games. Wigan were reported by the Wigan Evening Post to have spent £110,000 and given Richie Mathers in return for Gleeson. On the day after Gleeson's signing was announced, the draw for the Challenge Cup's fifth round took place. Wigan received an away tie to Wakefield Trinity Wildcats.

Gleeson featured in the first derby match of the year against St Helens RLFC. Ainscough put the home Wigan side ahead after nine minutes with a try on the wing, following a kick from Leuluai. Richards missed the conversion, and so Wigan only went four points ahead before St Helens replied with a try of their own through Keiron Cunningham, with Paul Wellens making the conversion. Hock had a try disallowed for a double movement, and later on a high tackle on Paleaaesina gave Roberts an opportunity to level the scores, with which he succeeded to draw the score at 6–6 at half time. Ainscough again carved out a lead for Wigan in the second half, and Roberts converted from the sideline. Two quick St Helens tries through Matt Gidley and Leon Pryce gave the visitors a 12–18 lead, and a Kyle Eastmond drop goal sealed the match for them.

Prior to their next match, Barrow Raiders confirmed that they had signed Lee Mossop on a month-long loan.

Despite providing a close fight against St Helens, the club's visit to Perpignan for their away tie against Catalans Dragons ended in its third consecutive loss. The Dragons scored first through Dimitri Pelo's try in the second minute. Wigan scored fourteen points in return, with three tries from Roberts, Ainscough and Gleeson and one conversion for a 4–14 lead. A ten-point lead proved precarious as Catalans ran in thirty-six unanswered points, the first of them coming through a Greg Bird try. Grégory Mounis scored next, and Thomas Bosc kicked the conversion to give the home side the lead, and Jason Ryles gained another try before half-time. The Catalans fullback Clint Greenshields scored first after the break and also scored the next try. Ryles also scored a second try of his own to open a twenty-six-point deficit. Tomkins and Richards gave Wigan two late tries, but the match by then was all but finished.

Similarly to Mossop, Darrell Goulding completed a transfer to Salford City Reds on a month-long loan deal. After an extension to this deal in May, Goulding was to be eventually recalled on 7 July to cope with an injury crisis.

The club's next match was against newly promoted Crusaders, who had not won a match yet in the Super League season coming into this fixture. Celtic led after two minutes, when Luke Dyer pounced for a try after Phelps mistakenly let the ball bounce into the in-goal area. Richards replied with a try on the wing, before O'Loughlin gathered his own kick for a solo try to present a lead to the home Wigan side. Two more tries came for Wigan before half-time with Riddell and Roberts both scoring one each. Sam Tomkins scored not long after the break thanks to a run from Palea'asesina. Carmont stretched the lead further with a try of his own, and O'Loughlin scored his second try of the match. Damien Quinn was sin-binned in his 100th competitive appearance for the Crusaders—Marshall Chalk was also sin-binned later on. Richards claimed his second try almost instantly after Quinn's dismissal. Mark Dalle Cort scored a late Celtic try and captain Jace Van Dijk successfully converted, but Wigan had another try before the game ended, with Sam Tomkins grounding his second try of the match—his team's ninth—to complete a convincing victory for the home side.

Transfer news occupied the break between this win and the Warriors' second league match against Wakefield Trinity Wildcats. The Wigan Evening Post reported that the club, as well as Leeds Rhinos, were interested in signing Richie Myler from Salford City Reds, although neither club were successful in their approaches to the player. Warrington Wolves would eventually sign Myler later in the year. Meanwhile, Thomas Leuluai extended his contract with the club for a further three years.

George Carmont had to be replaced at short notice prior to kick-off against the club's next opponents, Wakefield Trinity Wildcats. Shaun Ainscough was recalled to take his place in the team, and scored four tries to give his side a second consecutive win. Wakefield, like Celtic, put the first points on the scoreboard after Damien Blanch received a kick from Danny Brough for a try on the wing, with Brough converting for a 6–0 lead. Tim Smith linked with Cameron Phelps, who was switched from fullback to center in Carmont's absence, for Wigan's first try. Phelps turned provider as his work gave Ainscough two tries in nine minutes for a 6–16 lead, before Wigan's indiscipline gave Brough a penalty and a try following a handling error from the stand-in fullback, Pat Richards. Ainscough scored again on the wing to complete his hat-trick, but Wakefield replied after Brough intercepted a pass from Martin Gleeson and returned 45 metres for his second try to make the scores 20–22 at half time. Wakefield took the lead shortly after the break as Blanch took advantage of Ainscough's weak defence for his second try. This was Wakefield's last try of the match, as Phelps gathered a kick from Smith to score a try next to the posts which Richards converted successfully. Riddell was injured with a hamstring, and despite Wakefield pressure, Wigan scored again as a run from Sam Tomkins led to another try for Ainscough—his sixteenth in ten matches. Gleeson scored in the final ten minutes to put the game beyond the home side's reach.

May

Ahead of their 2009 Magic Weekend fixture against St Helens RLFC, Thomas Leuluai learned that he would not be called up to play in the 2009 ANZAC Test, news which was welcomed by Brian Noble, who stated that New Zealand had, "enough southern hemisphere-based Kiwis to cope." Leuluai instead took membership of a Wigan side which recorded its third successive league win at Murrayfield Stadium over a St Helens RLFC side including James Graham, who had complained earlier in the week about the event's location being too far away. Wigan had lost to St Helens at the Magic Weekend event in 2007 and 2008, 34–18 and 57–16 respectively, but it was Wigan's captain Sean O'Loughlin who scored the game's first try after seven minutes. Pat Richards scored the match's second try following a kick from O'Loughlin, and added both conversions to give Wigan a 12–0 lead. This was further extended after Gareth Hock scored after 29 minutes. Sean Long gained a try back for St Helens as his grubber kick rebounded off Leuluai, before a break from Sam Tomkins fed his older brother Joel for a try just before half time. Two minutes after the break, Wigan kicked a penalty to stretch the lead to 26–6, and Wigan ended any hope of a St Helens comeback as Leuluai scored following a break down the wing from Richards. St Helens scored the next two tries through Leon Pryce and Paul Wellens, with Long kicking both conversions, but Richards scored his second try and kicked the conversion to take his personal haul to twenty-two, and end the match 38–18. With Noble's contract due to expire at the end of the season, Ian Lenagan praised him for Wigan's biggest derby win in six years over St Helens, but refused to offer any assurances about Noble's future at the club, after Bradford Bulls refuted a claim that they wanted to replace Steve McNamara with Noble.

For the next match, the players again returned to Belle Vue, two weeks after their league win. The Wakefield Trinity Wildcats were coached by John Kear, twice a winner of the Cup as a head coach, most recently in 2005 with Hull FC, and in 1998 when his Sheffield Eagles side defeated Wigan 17–8 in the final, three years after Wigan's last of a record eight consecutive Challenge Cup final victories. The match did not start in Wigan's favour, as Danny Brough provided passes to Jason Demetriou and Tevita Leo-Latu, and kicked a conversion to give the Wildcats a 10–0 lead. Wigan went in ahead at half time though. Wigan got their first points with a try on the wing from Richards, and then another try from Michael McIlorum following a Gareth Hock pass. Brough kicked a drop-goal to give Wakefield a point lead, but Cameron Phelps scored a third Wigan try after Sean O'Loughlin broke the line from his own half. Wakefield went ahead for the third time twelve minutes after the break, with a grubber kick from Brough being gathered by Tony Martin. Stuart Fielden then scored his first try in two years before Sam Tomkins finished the game with a try of his own making. The fourth goal of the match meant the final scores were 17–28; a win for Wigan which advanced them to the quarter-finals. The day after, the draw for the next round to be played three weeks later was made, with Wigan receiving a home tie against Salford City Reds.

Following a run of four games, the club's next match was against Hull Kingston Rovers. Their preparations were boosted by news that Sam Tomkins would not receive a match ban for his conduct against Wakefield in the Challenge Cup tie. Goulding extended his loan spell at Salford City Reds, but with a condition that Wigan could recall him with 24 hours notice. The match seemed to be heading towards a 6–0 lead for Wigan at half-time, after Sean O'Loughlin scored a try and Richards kicked a goal, but a controversial try scored by Michael Dobson after the hooter had sounded was awarded by the referee, Richard Silverwood. Incensed, Wigan started the second half with another converted try from the captain, O'Loughlin, but this was to be their final score of the match. Paul Cooke collected his own kick for a solo try, and Jake Webster put Hull KR into the lead, with Dobson kicking both goals for a six-point advantage. A late penalty was kicked by Dobson for another two ponts, concluding the match in favour of Hull KR. The match ended Wigan's run of four victories, and placed Hull KR temporarily at the top of the Super League XIV table.

Following his loan spell at Barrow, Lee Mossop transferred to Huddersfield Giants on a month-long loan. Prior to Wigan's next match against Warrington Wolves, Noble, whose contract at Wigan was due to expire at the end of 2009, publicly admitted that he was becoming impatient with the lack of an offer from the club to extend his contract, after reports in the Sydney Morning Herald linked him to a coaching role at Sydney Roosters. Wigan had not won a game in Warrington since 2003, and despite leading for over half the match, failed to break this record. Warrington successfully charged down two kicks, before a kick from Thomas Leuluai on the third set of six tackles lead to Cameron Phelps scoring the match's opening try. Poor discipline from Ben Westwood gave a penalty, and Wigan almost took advantage when Joel Tomkins was held up over the try-line in the act of scoring by former Wigan full-back, Richie Mathers. Wigan again launched the next attack after forcing a goal line drop out, but a try from Amos Roberts was disallowed because of a knock-on by Pat Richards. Warrington then applied a sustained twenty minute period of pressure, but errors from Westwood and Briers kept them off the scoresheet. Briers weighted his next kick better, with Matt King out-jumping Shaun Ainscough to score Warrington's first try. Bridge's missed conversion meant that Wigan lead 6–4 at half-time, and a penalty kicked by Richards early in the second half meant that this lead was increased by two points. Warrington gained the lead after 55 minutes after Chris Riley punished Stuart Fielden and Andy Coley for giving away successive penalties with a try in the corner. Michael Monaghan shimmied past three Wigan defenders to finish the game off with another Warrington try.

Tim Smith had been left out of the tie against Warrington owing to a family illness, and did not return from his home country, Australia, in time for Wigan's Challenge Cup tie against Salford City Reds, but George Carmont returned from injury. Fielden was also forced to miss the game, after receiving a one-match ban for raising a knee in a tackle during the defeat to Warrington. Without Smith and Fielden, Wigan comprehensively beat Salford City Reds 28–6 to advance to the semi-finals stage of the tournament. Gareth Hock gave the home side the lead, before Salford equalised with a try from Luke Adamson. Wigan replied by taking the lead with a George Carmont try, and could have scored again after Hock broke the line, but Sam Tomkins knocked-on. Another knock-on, this time from Richards, denied Wigan another try. Salford launched repeated attacks on the Wigan line early in the second half, through Mark Henry and Stefan Ratchford, before Willie Talau was pushed into touch by Sam Tomkins. A penalty from Richards added two more points to Wigan's total, and he soon scored his second try, followed by his third on 70 minutes for his second hat-trick in a Wigan jersey. Hock scored the final try, his second, after Tomkins had come close, to finish the game in favour of the Warriors. Wigan therefore entered their first Challenge Cup semi-final since 2007, when they were defeated by Catalans Dragons at the Halliwell Jones Stadium in Warrington, and it was Warrington Wolves who were drawn as their 2009 semi-final opponents.

June

July

August

September

October

Transfers

Transfers in

Transfers out

Loans out

Player statistics

 Numbers in parenthesis represent number of appearances as an interchange.
 For players who have performed in more than one unique positions, the most frequent is used.

Fixtures

Super League

Challenge Cup

League table

Notable moments

References

External links
 Wigan Warriors official site

Wigan Warriors seasons
Wigan Warriors season